Acanthonotozomatidae is a family of amphipod crustaceans, which currently comprises the single genus Acanthonotozoma Boeck, 1876.

References

Gammaridea
Taxa named by Thomas Roscoe Rede Stebbing